Bang Goes the Knighthood is the tenth studio album by Irish chamber pop band the Divine Comedy, released on 31 May 2010 by Divine Comedy Records.

Track listing

Personnel 
Personnel adapted from liner notes included in Venus, Cupid, Folly & Time – Thirty Years of The Divine Comedy.

Musicians
Neil Hannon – vocals, piano
Tim Weller – drums
Cathy Davey – guest vocals (tracks 5, 6 and 9), drums (track 5)
Thomas Walsh – guest vocals (tracks 2 and 11), acoustic guitar (tracks 5 and 8)
Tosh Flood – guest vocals (track 1), electric guitar (track 5)
Andrew Skeet – orchestral arrangements and conductor (tracks 1, 5, 6, 7, 9 and 10)
Millennia Ensemble – orchestral performances

Production
Neil Hannon – producer, artwork concept
Fergal Davis – engineering
Ross Martin – additional engineering
Guy Massey – engineering, mixing (tracks 2, 5, 7, 8 and 12)
Bill Somerville-Large – mixing (tracks 1, 3, 4, 6, 9, 10)
Dan Grech – mixing (track 11)
Brian Hickley – artwork concept
Pauline Rowan – photography

References 

2010 albums
Choice Music Prize-winning albums
The Divine Comedy (band) albums